is a district located in Shiribeshi Subprefecture, Hokkaido, Japan.

As of 2004, the district has an estimated population of 28,213 and a density of 47.93 persons per km2. The total area is 588.64 km2.

Towns and villages
Akaigawa
Niki
Yoichi

Districts in Hokkaido